Elizabeth Blackmore (born ) is an Australian actress. She is best known for her roles as Natalie in the supernatural horror film Evil Dead, Valerie Tulle in The CW's supernatural drama series The Vampire Diaries, and Lady Toni Bevell in The CW's dark fantasy series Supernatural.

Personal life
Blackmore was born  and is from Perth, Australia. She is a graduate of the Western Australian Academy of Performing Arts.

In 2013, Blackmore was a finalist for the Heath Ledger Scholarship Award, which is intended to give emerging Australian talent a chance at success in Hollywood.

Filmography

References

External links

 

21st-century Australian actresses
Living people
1980s births
Actresses from Perth, Western Australia